= Chak Mirza =

- Location within Pakistan
- Coordinates: 33.25°N 73.25°E
- Country: Pakistan
- Province: (Islamabad Capital Territory) Islamabad C.T
- Elevation: 547 m (1,795 ft)
- Time zone: UTC+5 (PST)

Chak Mirza is a town and union council in the Islamabad Capital Territory of Pakistan. It is located at 33° 25' 50N 73° 25' 40E with an altitude of 547 metres (1797 feet).
